Syultino (Sülte) is a rural locality (a selo) and the administrative centre of Syultinsky Selsoviet, Ilishevsky District, Bashkortostan, Russia. The population was 339 as of 2010. There are 5 streets.

Geography 
Syultino is located 22 km southeast of Verkhneyarkeyevo (the district's administrative centre) by road. Yantuganovo is the nearest rural locality.

References 

Rural localities in Ilishevsky District